The Homer Lee Bank Note Company was a producer of postage stamps and currency and was founded in New York City by artist, engraver, and inventor Homer Lee.  In 1891, it was absorbed into the American Bank Note Company.

The Homer Lee Company grew in the 1880s and 1890s by producing engraved stock and bond certificates, primarily for railroads and mining companies. In 1883, it won the competition to engrave and print the first postal notes for the postal system during the contract's first four-year period.  Both the yellow and the white security papers for these early money orders were produced by Crane and Company in Dalton, Massachusetts. Homer Lee hired Thomas F. Morris, perhaps best known for his later work as the government's Chief of the Bureau of Engraving, from the American Bank Note Company to be his superintendent. The Homer Lee Bank Note Company produced currency and postage stamps for numerous foreign governments before amassing debts and being taken over by the American Bank Note Company in 1891.

See also

Postage stamps and postal history of the United States
Scripophily
New York Bank Note Company
American Bank Note Company

References and sources 

References

Sources
 New York Times, September 4, 1883 (New Postal Notes)

Banknotes of the United States
Defunct companies based in New York (state)
19th-century establishments in the United States
Postage stamps of the United States
Printing companies of the United States
Banknote printing companies
Defunct manufacturing companies based in New York City